Subsidized housing is government sponsored economic assistance aimed towards alleviating housing costs and expenses for impoverished people with low to moderate incomes. In the United States, subsidized housing is often called "affordable housing". Forms of subsidies include direct housing subsidies, non-profit housing, public housing, rent supplements/vouchers, and some forms of co-operative and private sector housing. According to some sources, increasing access to housing may contribute to lower poverty rates.

Types

Co-operative housing 

Some co-operative housing may offer subsidized units, but its main mandate is not subsidization. Its operating mandate is to offer non profit housing, where the rents or housing charges as they are called, goes back into the maintenance of the building instead of the profit of a landlord. Co-operative housing is controlled by the members of the co-op, which is run by a board of directors.  There is no outside landlord. In most cases, all residents of the co-op become members and are owners, and agree to follow certain by-laws.  Some co-ops are subsidized housing because they receive government funding to support a rent-geared-to-income program for low-income residents. There are other co-ops that are market-rate and limited equity, these types of cooperatives do not receive government funding and are not subsidized housing. In addition to providing affordable housing, some co-ops serve the needs of specific communities, including seniors, artists, and persons with disabilities.

Examples of co-operative housing include: College Houses, Urban Homesteading Assistance Board (UHAB), and Habitat '67, and regular rental housing be they regular looking apartments, townhouses or high end buildings such as those overlooking Central Park in New York City.

Housing subsidies 
Housing subsidies are government funded financial assistance programs designed to mitigate the costs of housing for low-income tenants. Subsidies can be provided in the form of housing vouchers given to tenants, e.g. Section 8 (Housing), or via direct deposits to landlords with government contracts to provide affordable housing.

Home mortgage interest deduction

The largest housing subsidy in the US is the home mortgage interest deduction, which allows homeowners with mortgages on first homes, second homes, and even boats with bathrooms to lower their taxes owed. The cost to the federal government of the mortgage interest deductions in 2018 was approximately $25 billion, down from $60 billion for 2017 as a result of the Tax Cuts and Jobs Act of 2017.  Some states also have the mortgage interest deduction provision.  The majority of the home mortgage interest deduction goes to the top 5% income earners in the United States.

Rental subsidies
Some housing subsidies are provided to low income tenants in renting housing. These include shelter allowances, housing supplements, and shelter supplements from regional and local governments designed to help low-income households that spend a large proportion of their income on rent, such as New York City's Family Eviction Prevention Supplement program. The subsidies are often defined by whether the subsidy is given to the landlord and then criteria are set for the tenants they can lease to or whether the subsidy is given to the tenant, typically as a voucher, and they are allowed to find suitable private housing. The subsidy amount is typically based on the tenant's income, usually the difference between the rent and 30% of the tenant's gross income, but other formulas have been used.

According to a 2018 study, major cuts in rental subsidies for poor households in the United Kingdom led to lowered house prices.

In rare cases a financial institution or non-profit organization will provide mortgage loans at rates that are not profitable for the sake of a specific group. In Canada one such organization is Non-Profit Housing Subsidies Canada which provides subsidized mortgage loans to employees and volunteers of other non-profit organizations.

Non-profit housing 

Non-profit housing is owned and managed by private non-profit groups such as churches, ethnocultural communities or by governments. Many units are provided by community development corporations (CDCs). They use private funding and government subsidies to support a rent-geared-towards-income program for low-income tenants.

Public housing 

Public housing is real property owned and managed by the government. Tenants must meet specific eligibility requirements.

Rent supplements 
Rent supplements are subsidies paid by the government to private landlords who accept low-income tenants. The supplements make up the difference between rental "market price" and the amount of rent paid by tenants, for example 30% of the tenants income. A notable example of a rent supplement in the United States is Section 8 of the Housing Act of 1937.

See also 

 Subsidized housing in the United States
 Public housing
 Affordable housing
 Housing estate
 Section 8 (USA)
 National Housing Act (Canada)
 HLM (France)
 Million Programme (Sweden)
 Plattenbau (Germany)
 Panelház (Hungary)
 Panelák and Sídlisko (Czech Republic and Slovakia)
 Khrushchyovka (Former Soviet Union)
Migration of the disadvantaged
Social welfare
Welfare state

References

Further reading 
 Koebel, C. Theodore, and Bailey, Cara L., "State Policies and Programs to Preserve Federally Assisted Low-Income Housing", Housing Policy Debate], v.3, issue 4, 1992, Office of Housing Policy Research, Fannie Mae, Washington, D.C.
 Koebel, C. Theodore, Shelter and Society: Theory, Research, and Policy for Nonprofit Housing, SUNY Press, 1998. 
 Minford, Patrick; Ashton, Paul; Peel, Michael; The Housing Morass: regulation, immobility & unemployment, Institute of Economic Affairs, 1987, .
 Minford, Patrick; Ashton, Paul; Peel, Michael; "The Effects of Housing Distortions on Unemployment", Oxford Economic Papers, New Series, Vol. 40, No. 2 (June 1988), pp. 322–345, Oxford University Press. The authors study the effect of rent subsidies in England on mobility and unemployment.
 UK Housing Review, University of York, England.

Public housing
Social programs
Housing
Government aid programs
State-based welfare in the United States